Westmoreland High School (WHS) is a public high school located in Westmoreland, Sumner County, Tennessee that enrolls approximately 500 students. It is one of eight high schools managed by Sumner County Schools.

Demographics
The ethnic makeup of the school is approximately 95.1% Non-Hispanic White, 2.4% Hispanic or Latino, 1.6% Non-Hispanic Black or African American, 0.2% Asian, and 0.6% from two or more races. Gender distribution is exactly 50% male and 50% female.

Athletics
The school's mascot is the Eagle, and their colors are red and white. The school competes in the Tennessee Secondary School Athletic Association (TSSAA) and offers the following sports:
Baseball
Boys' Basketball
Girls' Basketball
Boys' Cross Country
Girls' Cross Country
Boys' Golf
Girls' Golf
Boys' Track and Field
Girls' Track and Field
Cheerleading
Football
Softball - state championship, 1981
Volleyball
Soccer

References

Schools in Sumner County, Tennessee
Public high schools in Tennessee